Vexillum echinatum is a species of small sea snail, marine gastropod mollusk in the family Costellariidae, the ribbed miters.

Description
The length of the shell varies between 16 mm and 28 mm.

Distribution
Red Sea; Tropical Indo-Pacific to Polynesia.

References

External links
  Adams, A. (1853). Description of fifty-two new species of the genus Mitra, from the Cumingian collection. Proceedings of the Zoological Society of London. (1851) 19: 132-141
  Cernohorsky, Walter Oliver. The Mitridae of Fiji; The veliger vol. 8 (1965)

echinatum
Gastropods described in 1853